Richard Frank Szymanski  aka “Dick" Szymanski(October 7, 1932 – October 28, 2021) was an American professional football player who was a center for thirteen seasons with the Baltimore Colts in the National Football League (NFL).

Born and raised in Toledo, Ohio, Szymanski graduated from its Libbey High School, then played college football at the University of Notre Dame. He was the sixteenth overall selection of the 1955 NFL Draft, taken in the second round by the Colts.  He missed the 1956 season due to military service, and played on three NFL championship teams (1958, 1959, 1968).

After his playing career concluded in January 1969, Szymanski continued with Baltimore as a scout, personnel director, and general manager.  He succeeded Joe Thomas as general manager in January 1977, then stepped down in the spring of 1982. Dick was inducted June 1994 into the National Polish-American Sports Hall of Fame. He died October 28, 2021 at age 89.

References

External links
National Polish-American Sports Hall of Fame – Dick Szymanski

1932 births
2021 deaths
American people of Polish descent
Sportspeople from Toledo, Ohio
Players of American football from Ohio
American football centers
Notre Dame Fighting Irish football players
Baltimore Colts players
Western Conference Pro Bowl players
Baltimore Colts executives
National Football League general managers